PT TransNusa Aviation Mandiri, operating as TransNusa, is an Indonesian low-cost carrier based in Jakarta Soekarno-Hatta International Airport. It was launched in August 2005, serving various destinations from Kupang, Timor, using aircraft chartered from Pelita Air and Trigana Air Service. In August 2011, TransNusa received its own air operator's certificate (AOC) and scheduled commercial airline permit, operating as a regional carrier. The airline relaunched as a low-cost carrier in 2022 after briefly ceasing operations in 2020 as a result of the COVID-19 Pandemic.

History

Launch and early years (2005-2011) 
TransNusa undertook its first commercial flight on 4 August 2005 in co-operation with Trigana Air Service. Initial services were established to Waingapu, Tambolaka and Lewoleba followed by routes to Alor, Ende, Maumere, Ruteng serviced by a Trigana Air ATR 42-300. Subsequently, TransNusa agreed to further co-operative partnerships in Nusa Tenggara with Riau Airlines using Fokker 50s with a second Trigana supplied ATR 42 introduced in April 2006. In June, a Boeing 737-200 was supplied on contract from Trigana to service the routes, Kupang to Denpasar to Surabaya and Kupang to Makassar. In late 2006, the 737 service was replaced by a Pelita Air Fokker F28-4000.

In March 2007, arrangements with Mandala Airlines commenced with TransNusa acting both as a ticketing agent for Mandala at their office in Kupang and operating as a feeder service to the then-new Mandala Airbus A320 service operating from Kupang airport. This connected TransNusa's East Nusa Tenggara services into the Mandala Indonesian network through Jakarta and Surabaya. TransNusa commenced by block buying seats on the A320 services. In August 2007, TransNusa entered into a route subsidy agreement with the West Nusa Tenggara provincial government to provide services for the Mataram to Sumbawa and Mataram to Bima routes. The subsidised services were provided 3 times a week. In October 2007, TransNusa established the first implementation of airline e-ticketing in East Nusa Tenggara.By March 2008, TransNusa was operating 4 Fokker 50 turboprop aircraft in fleet co-operation arrangements with Riau Airlines. On 10 September 2008, Mandala Airlines announced arrangements with TransNusa to supply further feeder services from Jakarta via Surabaya providing services to passengers through the Kupang hub, connecting to and from destinations including Ende, Sika, Bajawa, Lombok, Waingapu, Tambolaka, Labuan Bajo and Alor.

In December 2009, charter airline Aviastar took delivery of a second new BAe 146-200 from BAE Systems to be operated on behalf of TransNusa in a 98-seat all-economy layout. It was announced that the new aircraft was to be based at Denpasar Airport in Bali to operate to destinations in East Nusa Tenggara. This aircraft complemented an ATR 42-300 aircraft acquired in a similar collaboration with Indonesia Air Transport (IAT) for operations in East Nusa Tenggara originating from Kupang and serving the Maumere, Alor and Lewoleba routes. The ATR-42-300 aircraft also served airports in the region that have a relatively short runway, such as Larantuka, Rote, and Sabu. The co-operation with IAT grew the airline's ATR 42-300 fleet to four aircraft by the end of the year In 2010, TransNusa offered connections into the Sriwijaya Air network to link directly with flights from Kupang to Surabaya and Jakarta.

Operating independently and suspension (2011-2020) 

In 2011, TransNusa expanded into operating commercially scheduled flights through the procurement of its own aircraft and the obtaining of the 121 Regular Aviation Operation License issued by the Indonesian Civil Aviation Authority.

In 2017, Transnusa expanded its fleet when it introduced two brand new ATR72-600s, followed by a further ATR72-600 and ATR 42–500 the following year. By June 2019, Transnusa had in its fleet, seven ATR aircraft in its commercial fleet with a further three on order, complemented by a single BAe 146. 

Impacted by the effects on the industry by the COVID-19 pandemic, the airline suspended operations in September 2020, which led to its fleet being transferred back to lessors.

Relaunch (2021-present) 
In November 2021, TransNusa announced through Instagram that the airline intends to return operating, although as a low-cost carrier (LCC) in place of its former regional model. The airline reapplied for an Air Operator's certificate and conducted proving flights in February 2022. In early 2022, the airline, now backed and part-owned by the China Aircraft Leasing Group (CALC), announced that it will be operating a mixed fleet of Airbus A320neos and Comac ARJ21s, making TransNusa the first foreign operator of the latter aircraft.

On October 6, 2022, TransNusa officially relaunched as a low-cost carrier with a flight between Jakarta and Denpasar.

Destinations
The airline has disclosed that it will focus on flying between larger airports rather than revive its former inter-island network.

As of 6 October 2022, TransNusa flies between 3 destinations.

Fleet

Current fleet
, TransNusa fleet consists of the following aircraft

Former fleet
 1 ATR 42-500
 6 ATR 72-600
 1 Fokker 70
 1 Fokker 50

Incidents and accidents
 On 4 April 2016, a TransNusa ATR 42-600, that was being towed from one part of Halim Perdanakusuma Airport in Jakarta to another, was involved in a collision with a Batik Air Boeing 737. The Boeing 737 was on its takeoff roll when its wingtip sliced the tail off the ATR 42-600 while it was being towed across the runway. The Boeing 737's wing then caught on fire. There were no fatalities in the accident.

References

Notes

External links
 Official website

Kupang
Airlines of Indonesia
Airlines established in 2005
Airlines formerly banned in the European Union
Transport in East Nusa Tenggara
Transport in Sulawesi
Indonesian companies established in 2005